The ampere (symbol: A), often shortened to amp, is the unit of electric current in the International System of Units (SI).  One ampere is equal to 1 coulomb or  electrons worth of charge moving past a point in a second. It is named after French mathematician and physicist André-Marie Ampère (1775–1836), considered the father of electromagnetism along with Danish physicist Hans Christian Ørsted.

As of the 2019 redefinition of the SI base units, the ampere is defined by fixing the elementary charge  to be exactly  C (coulomb), which means an ampere is an electrical current equivalent to  elementary charges moving every  seconds or  elementary charges moving in a second. Prior to the redefinition the ampere was defined as the current that would need to be passed through 2 parallel wires 1 metre apart  to produce a magnetic force of  newtons per metre.

The earlier CGS system had two definitions of current, one essentially the same as the SI's and the other using Coulomb's law as a fundamental relationship, with the unit of charge defined by measuring the force between two charged metal plates. The ampere was then defined as one coulomb of charge per second. In SI, the unit of charge, the coulomb, is defined as the charge carried by one ampere during one second.

History 

The ampere is named for French physicist and mathematician André-Marie Ampère (1775–1836), who studied electromagnetism and laid the foundation of electrodynamics. In recognition of Ampère's contributions to the creation of modern electrical science, an international convention, signed at the 1881 International Exposition of Electricity, established the ampere as a standard unit of electrical measurement for electric current.

The ampere was originally defined as one tenth of the unit of electric current in the centimetre–gram–second system of units. That unit, now known as the abampere, was defined as the amount of current that generates a force of two dynes per centimetre of length between two wires one centimetre apart. The size of the unit was chosen so that the units derived from it in the MKSA system would be conveniently sized.

The "international ampere" was an early realization of the ampere, defined as the current that would deposit  of silver per second from a silver nitrate solution.

Since power is defined as the product of current and voltage, the ampere can alternatively be expressed in terms of the other units using the relationship , and thus 1 A = 1 W/V. Current can be measured by a multimeter, a device that can measure electrical voltage, current, and resistance.

Former definition in the SI
Until 2019, the SI defined the ampere as follows:
The ampere is that constant current which, if maintained in two straight parallel conductors of infinite length, of negligible circular cross-section, and placed one metre apart in vacuum, would produce between these conductors a force equal to  newtons per metre of length. 

Ampère's force law states that there is an attractive or repulsive force between two parallel wires carrying an electric current. This force is used in the formal definition of the ampere.

The SI unit of charge, the coulomb, was then defined as "the quantity of electricity carried in 1 second by a current of 1 ampere". Conversely, a current of one ampere is one coulomb of charge going past a given point per second:

This definition of the ampere was most accurately realised using a Kibble balance, but in practice the unit was maintained via Ohm's law from the units of electromotive force and resistance, the volt and the ohm, since the latter two could be tied to physical phenomena that are relatively easy to reproduce, the Josephson effect and the quantum Hall effect, respectively.

Techniques to establish the realisation of an ampere had a relative uncertainty of approximately a few parts in 10, and involved realisations of the watt, the ohm and the volt.

Present definition

The SI unit of charge, the coulomb, "is the quantity of electricity carried in 1 second by a current of 1 ampere". Conversely, a current of one ampere is one coulomb of charge going past a given point per second:

Constant, instantaneous and average current are expressed in amperes (as in "the charging current is 1.2 A") and the charge accumulated (or passed through a circuit) over a period of time is expressed in coulombs (as in "the battery charge is "). The relation of the ampere (C/s) to the coulomb is the same as that of the watt (J/s) to the joule.

Units derived from the ampere 

The international system of units (SI) is based on 7 SI base units the second, metre, kilogram, kelvin, ampere, mole, and candela representing 7 fundamental types of physical quantity, or "dimensions", (time, length, mass, temperature, electrical current, amount of substance, and luminous intensity respectively) with all other SI units being defined using these. These SI derived units can either be given special names e.g. watt, volt, lux, etc. or defined in terms of others, e.g. metre per second. The units with special names derived from the ampere are:

There are also some SI units that are frequently used in the context of electrical engineering and electrical appliances, but can be defined independently of the ampere, notably the hertz, joule, watt, candela, lumen, and lux.

SI prefixes

Like other SI units, the ampere can be modified by adding a prefix that multiplies it by a power of 10.

See also 
 Ammeter
 Ampacity (current-carrying capacity)
 Electric current
 Electric shock
 Hydraulic analogy
 Magnetic constant
 Orders of magnitude (current)

References

External links 
 The NIST Reference on Constants, Units, and Uncertainty
 NIST Definition of ampere and μ0

SI base units
Units of electric current